Antistes (from Latin ante "before" and sto "stand") was from the sixteenth to the nineteenth century the title of the head of a church in the Reformed Churches in Switzerland. It was the highest office in churches with synodal church governance.

The word was used first in 1525 as an unofficial title of honor for Huldrych Zwingli in  Zurich, then in 1530 for Johannes Oecolampadius in  Basel and in 1532 for Heinrich Bullinger in Zurich.

The antistes was elected by the great council (the parliament) of the city and also held besides this office a pastorship of one of the main churches.

The antistes had to be an ordained minister. He was the official representative of the church. He presided over the synod, and over the theological examinations of candidates for the  office of pastor. His direct rights were very limited, but a man with high leadership capabilities like Zwingli or Bullinger could exert a great influence on the church in this office.

In the late nineteenth century the title was replaced by other office designations, e.g. church president or president of the church council.

Examples 

Antistes of Zurich
Huldrych Zwingli (1525–1531)
Heinrich Bullinger (1532–1575)
Rudolph Gualther (1575–1585)
Ludwig Lavater (1585–1586)
Johann Rudolph Stumpf (1586–1592)
Burkhard Leeman (1592–1613)
Johann Jakob Breitinger (Antistes) (1613–1645)
Johann Jacob Irminger (1645–1649)
Johann Jacob Ulrich (1649–1668)
 (1668–1677)
Johann Jacob Muller (1677–1680)
Johann Henry Erni (1680–1688)
Antonius Klinger (1688–1713)
Peter Zeller (1713–1718)
 (1718–1737)
Johann Conrad Wirz (1737–1769)
Johann Rudolph Ulrich (1769–1795)
Johann Jacob Hess (1795–29 May 1828)

Antistes of Basel
Johannes Oecolampadius (1530–1531)
Oswald Myconius (1531–1552)
Ambrosius Blarer (1552–1553)
Simon Sulzer (1553–1585)
Johann Jakob Grynaeus (1585–1618)
Johannes Wolleb (1618–1629)
 (1630–1654)
Lucas Gernler (1656–1675)
Peter Werenfels (1675–1703)
 (1816-1838)
Samuel Preiswerk (1859-1871)

Antistes of Schaffhausen
 (1569–1570)
 Melchior Habicht (1738-1817)

References

Bibliography

 
 Antistes in the Historical Lexicon of Switzerland (in German)

Ecclesiastical titles
History of Calvinism
Protestantism in Switzerland